Napoleon B. Atkinson (January 15, 1859 – October 31, 1950) was an American politician in the state of Washington. He served in the Washington House of Representatives.

References

Republican Party members of the Washington House of Representatives
1859 births
1950 deaths
People from Waitsburg, Washington